Julie Mostov is an American political scientist, academic administrator and consultant. She is the dean of NYU Liberal Studies.

Early life
Mostov graduated from Mount Holyoke College.  She earned a master's degree from the University of Belgrade and a PhD from New York University.

Career
Mostov was professor of Political Science at Drexel University, where she later became senior vice provost for global initiatives. In August 2017, she succeeded Fred Schwarzbach as the dean of NYU Liberal Studies. As a consultant in the Balkans, she has received over $2 million from the United States Department of State. She is also the president and director of Women Against Abuse.

Mostov is the author of two books, and the co-editor of a third book.

Works

References

Living people
Mount Holyoke College alumni
University of Belgrade alumni
New York University alumni
Drexel University faculty
New York University faculty
American women political scientists
American political scientists
American women academics
American university and college faculty deans
Women deans (academic)
Year of birth missing (living people)
21st-century American women